Merritt (formerly, Meritt) is an unincorporated community in Yolo County, California. It lies at an elevation of 56 feet (17 m). The post office for the area was established in 1859 as "Meritt", and discontinued in 1860. It was reestablished and ran between 1870 and 1873 as "Merritt". It was named after Hiram P. Merritt who came to Yolo County before 1866. In the late 19th century, Merritt was a shipment point on the railroad for cattle to market.  A 1913 book described Merritt, along with Mullen, as farming towns along the main automobile route from Davis to Woodland.

References

External links

Unincorporated communities in California
Unincorporated communities in Yolo County, California